This is a list of mosques in Bosnia and Herzegovina listed by municipality.

There were 4,190 Islamic places of worship in Bosnia and Herzegovina before the 1992–1995 war, including 1,149 mosques. A great number of them (up to 80% according to some sources) were damaged or destroyed during the conflict.

See also 
 Islam in Bosnia and Herzegovina

References 

Mosques
Bosnia and Herzegovina
 
Mosques